Kenneth Binns may refer to

 Ken Binns, Canadian squash player 
 Kenneth Binns (librarian) (1882–1969), National Library of Australia director